On 3 June 2020, the explosion occurred at the Yashashvi Rasayan Pvt. Ltd. chemical factory at Dahej in Gujarat, India, around 12:00 hours.

Five people were killed and 57 were injured in the explosion.

See also 
2020 Ahmedabad chemical factory blast
Visakhapatnam gas leak
List of industrial disasters

References 

2020 disasters in India
2020 industrial disasters
Chemical plant explosions
Disasters in Gujarat
2020s in Gujarat
June 2020 events in India